Ilir Bozhiqi (born 22 May 1965 in Qyteti Stalin) is an Albanian retired footballer who played as a goalkeeper for Dinamo Tirana.

Club career
Bozhiqi started his career with hometown club Naftëtari Qyteti Stalin, before moving to Dinamo Tirana, with whom he won two league titles and two Albanian cups in six years. He played in the infamous promotion/relegation playoff match in Qyteti Stalin against his former club Naftëtari in June 1988, which ended in riots and burning of the Dinamo team bus and led to the suspension of Naftëtari from playing football for a year.

He was the first foreign goalkeeper to play in the Romanian football. He transferred from Dinamo Tirana to FC Brașov in 1991, where he stayed for four seasons, before moving to another Romanian team Tractorul Braşov in 1995. In his spell at FC Braşov he came up to 57 caps in the first division, although having tough competition from teammates Şanta, Todericiu and Adrian Ene. In this time he also learned Romanian, saying in a visit back there: "The time spent in Romania was the most beautiful of my career. I can not forget Braşov and the colleagues that I had, starting from Şanta and Ene, up to Săvoiu and Marian Ivan."

Retirement
He is now goalkeeper coach at the Albania national team and at Skënderbeu Korcë. He also worked for Dinamo as a coach from 1997 to 2012.

Honours
Albanian Superliga: 2
 1986, 1990

References

1965 births
Living people
People from Kuçovë
Association football goalkeepers
Albanian footballers
KF Naftëtari Kuçovë players
FK Dinamo Tirana players
FC Brașov (1936) players
Albanian expatriate footballers
Expatriate footballers in Romania
Albanian expatriate sportspeople in Romania